This article displays the rosters for the participating teams at the 2017 FIBA Africa Club Championship for Women.

Equity Bank

Ferroviário de Maputo

First Bank

GS Pétroliers

Interclube

Kenya Ports Authority

Motema Pembe

Primeiro de Agosto

Vita Club

See also
 2017 FIBA Africa Championship for Women squads

References

External links
 2015 FIBA Africa Champions Cup Participating Teams

FIBA Africa Women's Clubs Champions Cup squads
Basketball teams in Africa
FIBA
FIBA